Blackbird is the third studio album by the New Zealand group Fat Freddy's Drop, released on 21 June 2013 on their own record label, The Drop. The album was a critical and commercial success, spending 4 weeks at the top of the New Zealand albums chart, and has been certified Platinum.

History
The album was recorded at the band's own studio, Bays, which is one of the last vinyl pressing plants in New Zealand, and also was at one time an apostolic church. On recording at Bays, Fitchie explained that "What you hear on the album is the sound of Bays; the room itself, the vibe of the place and the performance we can get out of the band in there." Describing the album, Chopper Reedz stated that "Blackbird is truer to FFD's musical philosophy than anything else we've done. The song structures are open and unruly – just like our live shows – whilst we've pushed ourselves to deliver rich and deeply layered arrangements that showcase Joe Dukie's exceptional voice. We feel totally at home melding together this unholy mix of disco, rootsy dub, blues, soul and electronic funk – it's what we do."

Reception
The album was a commercial success, debuting at number 1 on the New Zealand albums chart and staying in that position for 4 weeks. The album has been certified Platinum in New Zealand. The album has also received positive critical reception. Doubtful Sounds gave the album a very positive review, describing it as "without doubt their most cohesive and rewarding work to date." The New Zealand Herald gave it a positive review, stating "what's also amazing is that these days it takes something magical to engage and pique people's short attention spans – but Fat Freddy's do it." AltSounds praised the album, saying it "is a triumphant return to top form for Fat Freddy's Drop, an undeniable work of art created through love, passion and friendship."

Track listing

Charts

Certifications

References

Fat Freddy's Drop albums
2013 albums